The Copper City Chiefs were a low-level professional ice hockey team located in Rome, New York.  The team was owned by Wayne Premo.

Franchise History
The Chiefs joined the NEHL as an expansion team for the 2007-2008 season. When the season was cancelled and the league folded mid-season in January 2008 the Chiefs after playing 8 games had a record of 4 wins and 4 losses. The owners tried to schedule Canadian Sr. teams to complete the remaining the home schedule to no avail. The team was announced as a member of the EPHL on April 22, 2008 but the name was not officially announced until July 2, 2008. Mr Premeo obtained the name "Copper City Chiefs" from the Copper City Chiefs a Semi-professional hockey team from Rome, New York, who also played their games at the Kennedy Arena from 1964-1988.  However before the 2008-09 EPHL season began the franchise folded in early October 2008. Premo cited arena issues, economic issues, and lack of funds as reasons why the team folded

Regular season records

(*) 07-08 season- NEHL disbanded mid-season
(**)08-09 season- Franchise folded before season began

References

External links
Copper City Chiefs

2007 establishments in New York (state)
2008 disestablishments in New York (state)
Eastern Professional Hockey League (2008–09) teams
Ice hockey clubs established in 2007
Ice hockey teams in New York (state)
Rome, New York
Ice hockey clubs disestablished in 2008